Andělská Hora (Czech for "The Mountain of Angels") may refer to places in the Czech Republic:

Andělská Hora (Bruntál District), a town in the Moravian-Silesian Region
Andělská Hora (Karlovy Vary District), a municipality and village in the Karlovy Vary Region
Andělská Hora Castle above the village
Andělská Hora, a village and administrative part of Chrastava in the Liberec Region